Ribonuclease (commonly abbreviated RNase) is a type of nuclease that catalyzes the degradation of RNA into smaller components.  Ribonucleases can be divided into endoribonucleases and exoribonucleases, and comprise several sub-classes within the EC 2.7 (for the phosphorolytic enzymes) and 3.1 (for the hydrolytic enzymes) classes of enzymes.

Function 
All organisms studied contain many RNases of two different classes, showing that RNA degradation is a very ancient and important process. As well as clearing of cellular RNA that is no longer required, RNases play key roles in the maturation of all RNA molecules, both messenger RNAs that carry genetic material for making proteins and non-coding RNAs that function in varied cellular processes. In addition, active RNA degradation systems are the first defense against RNA viruses and provide the underlying machinery for more advanced cellular immune strategies such as RNAi.

Some cells also secrete copious quantities of non-specific RNases such as A and T1. RNases are, therefore, extremely common, resulting in very short lifespans for any RNA that is not in a protected environment. It is worth noting that all intracellular RNAs are protected from RNase activity by a number of strategies including 5' end capping, 3' end polyadenylation, formation of an RNA·RNA duplex, and folding within an RNA protein complex (ribonucleoprotein particle or RNP).

Another mechanism of protection is ribonuclease inhibitor (RI), which comprises a relatively large fraction of cellular protein (~0.1%) in some cell types, and which binds to certain ribonucleases with the highest affinity of any protein-protein interaction; the dissociation constant for the RI-RNase A complex is ~20 fM under physiological conditions.  RI is used in most laboratories that study RNA to protect their samples against degradation from environmental RNases.

Similar to restriction enzymes, which cleave highly specific sequences of double-stranded DNA, a variety of endoribonucleases that recognize and cleave specific sequences of single-stranded RNA have been recently classified.

RNases play a critical role in many biological processes, including angiogenesis and self-incompatibility in flowering plants (angiosperms).  Many stress-response toxins of prokaryotic toxin-antitoxin systems have been shown to have RNase activity and homology.

Classification

Major types of endoribonucleases

 : RNase A is an RNase that is commonly used in research. RNase A (e.g., bovine pancreatic ribonuclease A) is one of the hardiest enzymes in common laboratory usage; one method of isolating it is to boil a crude cellular extract until all enzymes other than RNase A are denatured. It is specific for single-stranded RNAs. It cleaves the 3'-end of unpaired C and U residues, ultimately forming a 3'-phosphorylated product via a 2',3'-cyclic monophosphate intermediate. It does not require any cofactors for its activity 
 : RNase H is a ribonuclease that cleaves the RNA in a DNA/RNA duplex to produce ssDNA. RNase H is a non-specific endonuclease and catalyzes the cleavage of RNA via a hydrolytic mechanism, aided by an enzyme-bound divalent metal ion.  RNase H leaves a 5'-phosphorylated product.
 : RNase III is a type of ribonuclease that cleaves rRNA (16s rRNA and 23s rRNA) from transcribed polycistronic RNA operon in prokaryotes. It also digests double strands RNA (dsRNA)-Dicer family of RNAse, cutting pre-miRNA (60–70bp long) at a specific site and transforming it in miRNA (22–30bp), that is actively involved in the regulation of transcription and mRNA life-time.
 EC number 3.1.26.-??:  RNase L is an interferon-induced nuclease that, upon activation, destroys all RNA within the cell
 : RNase P is a type of ribonuclease that is unique in that it is a ribozyme – a ribonucleic acid that acts as a catalyst in the same way as an enzyme. One of its functions is to cleave off a leader sequence from the 5' end of one stranded pre-tRNA. RNase P is one of two known multiple turnover ribozymes in nature (the other being the ribosome). In bacteria RNase P is also responsible for the catalytic activity of holoenzymes, which consist of an apoenzyme that forms an active enzyme system by combination with a coenzyme and determines the specificity of this system for a substrate. A form of RNase P that is a protein and does not contain RNA has recently been discovered.
 EC number 3.1.??:  RNase PhyM is sequence specific for single-stranded RNAs. It cleaves 3'-end of unpaired A and U residues.
 : RNase T1 is sequence specific for single-stranded RNAs. It cleaves 3'-end of unpaired G residues.
 : RNase T2  is sequence specific for single-stranded RNAs. It cleaves  3'-end of all 4 residues, but preferentially 3'-end of As.
 : RNase U2 is sequence specific for single-stranded RNAs. It cleaves 3'-end of unpaired A residues.
 : RNase V is specific for polyadenine and polyuridine RNA.
 : RNase  E  is  a  ribonuclease  of  plant  origin,  which modulates  SOS  responses  in  bacteria,  for  a response to the  stress of  DNA damage  by activation of  the  SOS mechanism  by  the  RecA/LexA dependent  signal transduction pathway that transcriptionally depresses a multiplicity  of  genes  leading  to  transit  arrest  of  cell division  as  well  as  initiation  of  DNA  repair. 
 : RNase  G It is involved in processing the 16'-end of the 5s rRNA. It is related to chromosome separation and cell division. It is considered one of the components of cytoplasmic axial filament bundles. It is also thought that it can regulate the formation of this structure.

Major types of exoribonucleases
 EC number :  Polynucleotide Phosphorylase (PNPase) functions as an exonuclease as well as a nucleotidyltransferase.
 EC number : RNase PH functions as an exonuclease as well as a nucleotidyltransferase.
 EC number 3.1.??: RNase R is a close homolog of RNase II, but it can, unlike RNase II, degrade RNA with secondary structures without help of accessory factors.
 EC number : RNase D is involved in the 3'-to-5' processing of pre-tRNAs.
 EC number 3.1.??: RNase T is the major contributor for the 3'-to-5' maturation of many stable RNAs.
 : Oligoribonuclease degrades short oligonucleotides to mononucleotides.
 : Exoribonuclease I degrades single-stranded RNA from 5'-to-3', exists only in eukaryotes.
 : Exoribonuclease II is a close homolog of Exoribonuclease I.

RNase specificity
The active site looks like a rift valley where all the active site residues create the wall and bottom of the valley. the rift is very thin and the small substrate fits perfectly in the middle of the active site, which allows for perfect interaction with the residues. It actually has a little curvature to the site which the substrate also has.  Although usually most exo- and endoribonucleases are not sequence specific, recently CRISPR/Cas system natively recognizing and cutting DNA was engineered to cleave ssRNA in a sequence-specific manner.

RNase contamination during RNA extraction
The extraction of RNA in molecular biology experiments is greatly complicated by the presence of ubiquitous and hardy ribonucleases that degrade RNA samples. Certain RNases can be extremely hardy and inactivating them is difficult compared to neutralizing DNases. In addition to the cellular RNases that are released, there are several RNases that are present in the environment. RNases have evolved to have many extracellular functions in various organisms. For example, RNase 7, a member of the RNase A superfamily, is secreted by human skin and serves as a potent antipathogen defence. In these secreted RNases, the enzymatic RNase activity may not even be necessary for its new, exapted function. For example, immune RNases act by destabilizing the cell membranes of bacteria.

References

Sources
 D'Alessio G and Riordan JF, eds. (1997) Ribonucleases: Structures and Functions, Academic Press.
 Gerdes K, Christensen SK and Lobner-Olesen A (2005). "Prokaryotic toxin-antitoxin stress response loci". Nat. Rev. Microbiol. (3)  371–382.

External links 
 IUBMB Enzyme Database for EC 3.1
 Integrated Enzyme Database for EC 3.1

 
EC 3.1
EC 3.1.26
EC 3.1.27